The Middle Meherrin River is a river in the United States state of Virginia.

See also
List of rivers of Virginia

References

USGS Hydrologic Unit Map - State of Virginia (1974)

Rivers of Virginia
Tributaries of Albemarle Sound